Ruisbroek is a village in the municipality of Sint-Pieters-Leeuw, in the Belgian province of Flemish Brabant. Previously a separate municipality, it became a deelgemeente of Sint-Pieters-Leeuw in 1977. Due to its proximity to the Brussels Capital Region, the Brussels-Charleroi Canal, the Zenne river, the railway Brussels—Mons—Quévy and the Brussels outer ring (R0), the ward is heavily urbanised.

Ruisbroek has a railway station along the line Leuven—Braine-le-Comte. It is only 6 minutes to the Brussels south station.  It is home to a large community of French-speakers.  Ruisbroek has become popular with young families who wish to stay close to Brussels, but due to the house pricing have opted to move a little further from the city.  The  path along the canal offers a peaceful place for walking or cycling.

Former municipalities of Flemish Brabant